Billed as The Who Hits 50!, The Who's 2014–16 tour was a tour celebrating the 50th anniversary of the band. Roger Daltrey has referred to this tour as the band's "long goodbye" hinting that it will be the final tour for The Who. The tour consisted of 70 dates with the band performing in Asia, Europe and North America.

An announcement about the tour came through the band's website and social media networks on 30 June 2014. Pete Townshend described the show as "Hits, Picks, Mixes and Misses", for the band would play all their classic anthems as well as tackling deeper cuts from their catalog;

In addition to longtime veterans Zak Starkey, Pino Palladino, and Simon Townshend, the same backing musicians from the group's previous tour were retained, minus the horn section.

In September 2015 the band announced that fall 2015 North American leg was being postponed due to Daltrey contracting viral meningitis and told by doctors to rest. The tour resumed in February 2016 and ended on 29 May 2016.

History 
The tour kicked off with the group's first ever show in the United Arab Emirates, followed by a UK leg. The band included several numbers not included in any recent tours, including the first full performance of "A Quick One (While He's Away)" since 1970 and the first full band appearances of "So Sad About Us" (Townshend and special guest Paul Weller performed it acoustically at the Royal Albert Hall in 2000) since 1967; "Pictures of Lily" and "Join Together" had not been played since 1989. The North American leg, with Joan Jett and the Blackhearts featured as the opening act, kicked off in April 2015. Eddie Vedder joined the band for a performance of "The Real Me" in Chicago. Daltrey suffered a throat infection in September 2015 forcing the band to postpone the 2015 fall North American dates until February 2016. Tal Wilkenfeld was featured as the opening act when the North American tour resumed on 27 February 2016. Pete Townshend was suffering from his own ailments when the band hit Washington, D.C. on 24 March 2016. Townshend was suffering from a cold and losing his voice, so his brother Simon  took over his backing vocals. However, he was able to make it through "Pinball Wizard" and "I'm One" despite his rough sounding voice. "Eminence Front", which had been featured in all of the shows, was dropped in favor of the unrehearsed and rarely played "Slip Kid" due to Townshend's hoarse voice.  For most of the 2016 tour dates in North America, British band Slydigs performed a four-song opener for The Who, though the band's final North American concert in Las Vegas, Nevada at the Colosseum at Caesars Palace did not feature an opening act.

Tour band

Original members
Roger Daltrey – lead vocals, harmonica, acoustic guitar, rhythm guitar, tambourine
Pete Townshend – lead guitar, acoustic guitar, vocals
John Entwistle – bass solo on "5:15" (via video and audio recording from Live at the Royal Albert Hall)
Keith Moon – drums, vocals on "Bell Boy" (via audio recording from Quadrophenia)

Backing musicians
Zak Starkey – drums, percussion
Pino Palladino – bass guitar
Simon Townshend – rhythm guitar, acoustic guitar, vocals
Loren Gold – keyboards, backing vocals, percussion, jaw harp
Frank Simes - keyboards, backing vocals, percussion, banjo, mandolin
John Corey - keyboards, backing vocals, percussion, bass harmonica

Set list
This set list is representative of the performance on 26 May 2016 in Brooklyn, New York. It does not represent all concerts for the duration of the tour.

"I Can't Explain"
"The Seeker"
"Who Are You"
"The Kids Are Alright"
"I Can See For Miles"
"My Generation"
"Behind Blue Eyes" 
"Slip Kid"
"Bargain"
"Join Together"
"You Better You Bet"
"I'm One"
"Love, Reign O'er Me"
"Eminence Front"
"A Quick One (While He's Away)"
"Amazing Journey"
"Sparks"
"Pinball Wizard"
"See Me, Feel Me"
"Baba O'Riley"
"Won't Get Fooled Again"

Tour dates

Cancellations and rescheduled shows

Notes

References

External links
The Who Online Concert Guide

The Who concert tours
2014 concert tours
2015 concert tours
2016 concert tours
Farewell concert tours